Taramani is a railway station on the Chennai MRTS in Chennai, India. Located off MGR Main Road in Taramani, it exclusively serves the Chennai MRTS.

History
Taramani station was opened on 19 November 2007, as part of the second phase of the Chennai MRTS network.

Structure
The length of the platform is 280 m. The station premises includes 9,080 sq m of open parking area.

Service and connections
In the return direction from Velachery, it is currently the third station towards Chennai Beach station A 3.4 km-long, 18 m-wide access road to Perungudi station and Taramani station is being constructed along the MRTS line from Velachery to Taramani.

See also
 Chennai MRTS
 Chennai suburban railway
 Chennai Metro
 Transport in Chennai

References

Chennai Mass Rapid Transit System stations
2007 establishments in Tamil Nadu
Railway stations in Chennai
Railway stations opened in 2007